The Upper Cisokan Pumped Storage Plant is a proposed pumped-storage hydropower facility in Indonesia, due for completion by 2025.

It will have an installed capacity of 1,040 MW and will be Indonesia's first pumped-storage power plant.

Background
Studies for the project were carried out in the 1990s and a detailed design was completed in 2002. A World Bank loan for the project was approved in May 2011 and signed in November. The West Java government approved the project in October 2011. Preliminary construction such as access road building began in early 2014. The first generator was then expected to be operational by 2019. 

However, the project has been delayed and the loan was cancelled in May 2017. Construction did not start partly due to the occurrence of landslides. The access road has been built but is considered unsafe. In 2019, a new loan agreement with the World bank was found, and the facility was expected to become operational by 2025, according to Indonesia's Electricity Supply Business Plan.

Of the project's US$800 million cost, US$650 million is being provided by the World Bank. The remaining US$150 million is to be supplied by the project owner Perusahaan Listrik Negara.

Design and operation
The power plant will operate by shifting water between two reservoirs; the lower reservoir on the Upper Cisokan River (a branch of the Citarum River), and the upper reservoir on the Cirumamis River which is a right-bank tributary of the former. When energy demand is high, water from the upper reservoir is sent to the power plant to produce electricity. When energy demand is low, water is pumped from the lower reservoir to the upper by the same pump-generators. This process repeats as needed and allows the plant to serve as a peaking power plant.

Both reservoirs will be formed by concrete gravity dams using roller-compacted concrete. Each will have an overflow spillway at the center of their center. Of the total capacity,  can be used for pumping up to the upper reservoir. The surface area of the lower reservoir will be . Of that capacity,  is active (or usable) storage for power generation.

The power plant will be located underground near the lower reservoir. Surge tanks on each headrace tunnel help prevent water hammer. Each headrace tunnel connects to a steel-lined penstock, each of which later bifurcates into two penstocks. Each of these four penstocks will supply water to the turbines during power generation. After power generation the water will be discharged into the lower reservoir via four tailrace tunnels. When pumping water moves through the same conduits back to the upper reservoir. The power plant will contain four Francis pump-turbines which are rated at 260 MW each for power generation and 275 MW for pumping.

See also

List of power stations in Indonesia
List of pumped-storage hydroelectric power stations

References

Dams in Indonesia
Hydroelectric power stations in Indonesia
Pumped-storage hydroelectric power stations
Proposed renewable energy power stations in Indonesia
Proposed pumped-storage hydroelectric power stations